Blackfriars Road is a road in Southwark, SE1. It runs between St George's Circus at the southern end and Blackfriars Bridge over the River Thames at the northern end, leading to the City of London. Halfway up on the west side is Southwark Underground station, on the corner with The Cut. Opposite is Palestra, a large new office building which houses the Surface transport division of Transport for London, which was formerly the headquarters of the London Development Agency.

The road forms part of the A201. The road adjoins Stamford Street and Southwark Street at the northern end. Originally known as Surrey Street, the road was built in the 1760s as the south approach to Blackfriars Bridge, and was laid out by the bridge surveyor, Robert Mylne.

See also 
 Blackfriars Road railway station (1864–1868)
 Blackfriars station
 A201 road
 Surrey Chapel

References

External links 
 London Development Agency website

Streets in the London Borough of Southwark
Odonyms referring to religion